Horace John "Johnny" Woodward (16 January 1924 – 8 August 2002) was an English professional footballer who played for Tottenham Hotspur, Queens Park Rangers, Tonbridge, Snowdown Colliery Welfare, Walsall, Stourbridge and Horsham.

Playing career
Woodward signed as an amateur for Tottenham Hotspur in 1939. In 1941 he made his senior debut in the London Wartime League. During World War II he served as a gunner in the Merchant Navy. On his return from duty Spurs offered him a professional contract in May 1946. The central defender made his Football League debut against Newport County in September 1946 when he replaced the injured Bill Nicholson – Woodward remains the only Lilywhite to make his League debut at Somerton Park. Woodward played a total of 67 matches in all competitions and scored one goal for the Lilies between 1946–49. Queens Park Rangers paid £10,500 for his services in 1949. He went on to feature in a further 57 fixtures. After leaving Loftus Road he joined Tonbridge in 1951 and went on to have brief spells at Snowdown Colliery Welfare, Stourbridge and Walsall where he participated in five matches in 1953.

Management career
Woodward became player/manager at Horsham before taking charge at Willesden & Kingsbury a post he held to 1971. He later went on to occasionally manager the Maccabi club of London.

Post–football career
He continued to play football throughout the 1960s and regularly turned out for the Ex–Spurs XI while employed by Schweppes and then the British Oxygen Company. Woodward retired in 1988 before settling in Willesden. After a long illness he died in a Cricklewood nursing home on 8 August 2002.

References

External links
The Saddlers players- Horace Woodward
Photograph of Woodward

Woodward profile

1924 births
2002 deaths
Footballers from Islington (district)
English footballers
Tottenham Hotspur F.C. players
Queens Park Rangers F.C. players
Tonbridge Angels F.C. players
Snowdown Colliery Welfare F.C. players
Walsall F.C. players
Stourbridge F.C. players
Horsham F.C. players
English Football League players
English football managers
Association football defenders